Karl Marx (5 May 1818 – 14 March 1883) was a German philosopher, economist, sociologist, historian, journalist, and revolutionary socialist. Marx's work in economics laid the basis for the current understanding of labour and its relation to capital, and has influenced much of subsequent economic thought. He published numerous books during his lifetime, the most notable being The Communist Manifesto. Marx studied at the University of Bonn and the University of Berlin, where he became interested in the philosophical ideas of the Young Hegelians. After his studies, he wrote for a radical newspaper in Cologne, and began to work out his theory of dialectical materialism. He moved to Paris in 1843, where he began writing for other radical newspapers and met Fredrick Engels, who would become his lifelong friend and collaborator. In 1845 he was exiled and moved to London together with his wife and children where he continued writing and formulating his theories about social and economic activity. He also campaigned for socialism and became a significant figure in the International Workingmen's Association.

Marx's theories about society, economics and politics – collectively known as Marxism – hold that human societies progress through class struggle: a conflict between an ownership class that controls production and a dispossessed labouring class that provides the labour for production. He called capitalism the "dictatorship of the bourgeoisie," believing it to be run by the wealthy classes for their own benefit; and he predicted that, like previous socioeconomic systems, capitalism produced internal tensions which would lead to its self-destruction and replacement by a new system: socialism. He argued that class antagonisms under capitalism between the bourgeoisie and proletariat would eventuate in the working class' conquest of political power in the form of a dictatorship of the proletariat and eventually establish a classless society, socialism or communism, a society governed by a free association of producers. Along with believing in the inevitability of socialism and communism, Marx actively fought for their implementation, arguing that social theorists and underprivileged people alike should carry out organised revolutionary action to topple capitalism and bring about socio-economic change.

Marx has been described as one of the most influential figures in human history. Revolutionary socialist governments espousing Marxist concepts took power in a variety of countries in the 20th century, leading to the formation of such socialist states as the Soviet Union in 1922 and the People's Republic of China in 1949.  Many labour unions and workers' parties worldwide are influenced by Marxism, while various theoretical variants, such as  Leninism, Stalinism, Trotskyism, and Maoism, were developed from them. Marx is typically cited, with Émile Durkheim and Max Weber, as one of the three principal architects of modern social science.

Timeline
The list on the left recounts significant events in the life of Karl Marx, and his friends and family. The list on the right provides contextual information, recounting wider political and historical events that had an effect on Marx.

Notes

Bibliography

 
 
 

 
 
 
 
 
 
 
 
 
 
 

Marx